Alejandro Maximiliano Camargo (born 12 June 1989) is an Argentine-born Chilean footballer who currently plays for Deportes Melipilla of the Primera División de Chile.

Career
He previously played for Godoy Cruz in the Argentine Primera División.

His goal against O'Higgins was nominated for the FIFA Puskás Award in 2017.

Personal life
He acquired the Chilean nationality by descent when he was a player of Lota Schwager, due to the fact that his mother, Jacqueline Cecilia, is Chilean. His maternal family comes from San Javier.

References

External links
 
 
 Alejandro Camargo at playmakerstats.com (English version of ceroacero.es)

1989 births
Living people
Sportspeople from Mendoza Province
Argentine footballers
Argentine expatriate footballers
Argentine emigrants to Chile
Citizens of Chile through descent
Chilean footballers
Godoy Cruz Antonio Tomba footballers
Club Atlético Sarmiento footballers
Lota Schwager footballers
Curicó Unido footballers
Universidad de Concepción footballers
Deportes Melipilla footballers
Primera Nacional players
Argentine Primera División players
Primera B Metropolitana players
Torneo Argentino B players
Primera B de Chile players
Chilean Primera División players
Argentine expatriate sportspeople in Chile
Expatriate footballers in Chile
Association football forwards
Naturalized citizens of Chile